Erebus pilosa is a moth of the family Erebidae. It is found in China and Taiwan.

References

Moths described in 1900
Erebus (moth)